Her Luck in London is a 1914 British silent drama film directed by Maurice Elvey and starring A. V. Bramble, Fred Groves and M. Gray Murray. It was based on a play of the same name by Charles Darrell. The film follows a naive country girl as she heads to London, where she is corrupted.

Cast
 A. V. Bramble - Honourable Gerald O'Connor
 Fred Groves - Richard Lenowen
 M. Gray Murray - Stephen Harbourne
 Elisabeth Risdon - Nellie Harbourne

References

External links

1914 films
1914 drama films
British silent feature films
1910s English-language films
Films directed by Maurice Elvey
British films based on plays
British drama films
British black-and-white films
1910s British films
Silent drama films
Silent crime films